Andrew Sibusiso Zondo (1966/67 - 9 September 1986) was an Umkhonto we Sizwe (MK) operative. He detonated a bomb at Sanlam Centre in Amanzimtoti on 23 December 1985, killing five people.

Early life 
Andrew Sibusiso Zondo was born in 1966/67. He joined the ANC when he was 16 years of age, and went into exile. He initially wanted to further his studies in exile but eventually trained as a guerrilla in Angola for the purpose of fighting South Africa's apartheid government. He grew up at KwaMashu Township which is situated in the outskirt of Durban. He attended Ngazane Lower Primary School, then went to Phakama Higher Primary and eventually did his high school education at Nhlakanipho High School in KwaMashu, before he left for exile around the 1980s. He did not complete his high school education. He developed an interest in politics at an early age.

Amanzimtoti bombing 
On 20 December 1985, the South African security forces carried out a raid in Lesotho, killing nine anti-apartheid activists. In retaliation, Durban MK operatives including  Zondo placed a limpet mine at the Amanzimtoti Sanlam shopping centre on 23 December 1985 killing two adults and three children and injuring 161.

Irma Bencini (48) was one of those killed. Her stepdaughter, Debbie Scott, an Amanzimtoti resident, later said "I remember that day when we were all excitedly preparing for Christmas. I went to the then OK Bazaar near Sanlam Centre and my stepmother said she needed to go into the nearby supermarket. Within a few minutes I heard a loud bang and realized she was in danger. I rushed to the scene and found her body. She died instantly… My dad Mario has never been the same since then, and that incident will forever haunt us. Surely Zondo knew that planting a bomb in a supermarket was going to kill innocent people.

Oliver Tambo, the former president of the ANC, said that the killing of civilians was against ANC policy, and accordingly he disapproved of the bombing, but understood the reasons for its being carried out.

Death 
Zondo was later captured on 29 December 1985 by the South African security forces. He was prosecuted, found guilty and sentenced to death. He was executed in Pretoria on 9 September 1986. The judge that presided over this case was Justice Ramon Leon. Two co-accused were acquitted in court but later extrajudicially executed by the Security Branch.

Legacy 
The Lovu Primary School was renamed Andrew Zondo Primary School in honour of Zondo as a cadre of Umkhonto we Sizwe (MK). This move was vehemently opposed by political opposition parties in South Africa on the basis that as a convicted killer, he was a bad example to young children.

Kingsway Road in Amanzimtoti was also renamed after Zondo. This development also drew criticism from political opposition parties. Their argument was that it was morally unjustifiable to honour a person who was a killer of innocent victims.

General Siphiwe Nyanda, former Chief of Staff of Umkhonto we Sizwe (MK), asked about Zondo's legacy, said "The fact that Andrew Zondo was engaged in such an act, [it] does not make him an outcast in our own vocabulary. He is still our hero, he is still a hero, I agree."

In 2022 a sign post in Amanzimtoti which carries his name was vandalised by two white male citizens as a female counterpart recorded the video.

External links 
 The Amanzimtoti bombing thirty years on: Politicsweb

References 

1960s births
1986 deaths
UMkhonto we Sizwe personnel
People convicted of murder by South Africa
Terrorism in South Africa
Executed South African people
20th-century executions by South Africa
South African mass murderers
South African murderers of children
South African people convicted of murder
Executed mass murderers
Year of birth uncertain